Events from the year 1573 in Sweden

Incumbents
 Monarch – John III

Events

 
 23 January - Battle of Lode
 - The deposed King Eric is separated from his family: the former King is taken to Västerås Castle, Karin Månsdotter and their daughter to Åbo Castle, and their son is taken from them.

Births

 - Johannes Canuti Lenaeus, professor at Uppsala University and Archbishop of Uppsala (died 1669)

Deaths

 1 January - Hans Boije af Gennäs, commander 
 - Laurentius Petri, the first Evangelical Lutheran Archbishop of Sweden (born 1499)

References

 
Years of the 16th century in Sweden
Sweden